The Maitland Mercury is Australia's third oldest regional newspaper, preceded only by the Geelong Advertiser (estab. 1840) and the Launceston Examiner (estab. 1842).
The Maitland Mercury was established in 1843 when it was called The Maitland Mercury and Hunter River General Advertiser. The Maitland Mercury is still in circulation serving the city of Maitland and the surrounding Lower Hunter Valley.

These days the Maitland Mercury has a weekly print edition which appears on Fridays.

History

It was originally a weekly newspaper, founded by Richard Jones, an English migrant from Liverpool who also served as treasurer of NSW for a brief period. The first issue was published as The Maitland Mercury and Hunter River General Advertiser on 7 January 1843. It has been a daily since 1894. when it was issued under two banners as The Maitland Daily Mercury  during the week and The Maitland Weekly Mercury  on Saturdays. From 1870 to 1873, Margaret Falls was the proprietor. In 1939 the weekly edition was absorbed into the daily and it became known as The Maitland Mercury. It was issued simply as The Mercury from  1960 to 1973  when it reverted again to The Maitland Mercury. 
 
Even when it was first published The Mercury was more than just a local newspaper reporting on local issues. It published national and international news, which was critical to the financial survival of the newspaper at the time, and it continues to do so.

Digitisation
The paper has been digitised as part of the Australian Newspapers Digitisation Program of the National Library of Australia.

See also 
 List of newspapers in Australia
 List of newspapers in New South Wales

References

External links
 
 
 
 Maitland Mercury homepage

Newspapers published in New South Wales
Maitland, New South Wales
Publications established in 1843
1843 establishments in Australia
Daily newspapers published in Australia
Newspapers on Trove